Martim Moniz (died 1147) was a Portuguese knight of noble birth, and famous figure in the Siege of Lisbon in 1147.

According to legend, Martim Moniz was a knight participating in the Christian invasion force, led by king Afonso I of Portugal, in the Siege of Lisbon, during the Reconquista. At one point in the siege of São Jorge Castle, he saw the Moors closing the castle doors. He led an attack on the doors, and sacrificed himself by lodging his own body in the doorway, preventing the defenders from fully closing the door.

This act allowed time for his fellow soldiers to arrive and secure the door, leading to the eventual capture of the castle. Martim Moniz was killed in the incident. In his honor, the entrance was dubbed Porta de Martim Moniz (Gate of Martim Moniz).

There are currently several monuments and parks named after Martim Moniz in Lisbon. One of Lisbon's metro stations is named after him. The station features a stylized graphic depiction of the event on its walls.

One of his sons, Pedro Martins, Lord of the Tower of Vasconcelos, was the ancestor of the prominent Vasconcelos family.

References

1147 deaths
Christians of the Second Crusade
People of the Reconquista
Portuguese knights
Portuguese military personnel killed in action
12th-century Portuguese people
Year of birth unknown